Shtërpcë or Štrpce (Serbian Cyrillic: Штрпце), is a town and municipality located in the Ferizaj District in Kosovo. As of 2015, it has an estimated population of 13,630 inhabitants.

History

Middle Ages
In Medieval Serbia, the župa (county, district) of Sirinić (Sirinićka župa), first mentioned in a 13th-century charter, covered the whole of modern Štrpce municipality, having the towns of Gradište (site in Brezovica) and Zidinac (site in Gotovuša). Several remains of Byzantine forts exist in the region. At the top of the Čajlije hill, above the mouth of the Piljevac creek of the Lepenac river, there exists the remains of the Gradište fort, which has two layers, the first from the 6th century, and the second from the 13th century. The fort is in ruins, of which a donjon tower, and outlines of other buildings, can be identified. The entrance to the city, at the north, was protected by a tower. From that tower, a rampart continued, with another tower, from where a defensive wall stretched to the foot of the hill, towards the Lepenac.

World War II
On June 28, 1944, during World War II, Bulgarian soldiers executed 46 locals (of whom 12 were children) on the Rakanovac site in Brezovica, after the death of one of their soldiers.

Demographics

According to the 2011 census done by the Government of Kosovo, the municipality of Štrpce had 6,949 inhabitants; 3,757 Kosovo Albanians (54%), 3,148 Serbs (45.3%), and others. However, these results should be taken with caution, due to the partial boycott by the Serbs. According to the Municipal Office for Communities and Returns (MOCR), the total population is estimated at 13,630 inhabitants. ECMI calculated in 2013 that there were 9,100 (70.58%) Serbs in Štrpce.

Ethnic groups
The ethnic composition of the municipality of Štrpce:

Famous people
Staja Marković, after whom the primary school is named, was a guerrilla fighter in the 20th century.

Geography and economy

Its municipal borders almost overlap with the borders of Sirinić Valley. Border lines are made of the mountain massive of the north-east part of the Šar Mountains and its branches: Ošljak, Kodža Balkan, Žar and Jezerska Mountain. Dominant mountain massifs create a natural isolation for this municipality towards north and south, meanwhile, by Brod canyon the municipality is open towards Kosovo Valley, and through Prevalac toward Prizren Valley. The bordering municipalities are Ferizaj, Kaçanik, Suva Reka and Prizren, while the municipality is bordered by North Macedonia to the south.

Štrpce has a relatively favorable location in comparison to other cities and administrative, economic centers of Kosovo, as well as the north and northwest part of North Macedonia. In the past few years a number of asphalt roads were constructed within the municipal territory, so that almost all settlements are connected with the center of the municipality. Relief features and potential for using agricultural land are prerequisites for the bloodstream of the settlements' network which are the valley's predominant type. Most of the settlements are not urbanized and mainly not functionally integrated, with the exception of Brezovica settlement where tourism assets are located and Štrpce as the center of the municipality.

The diversity and attractive natural resources represent good potential for a faster economic development of the municipality. The most valuable natural potentials of the municipality are its environment values, climate features and untouched nature. Mountains with so called Alpine mountain relief, in the upper part of the mountain where there is snow up to 280 days during the year are just some of the advantages for the development of winter tourism. The Šar Mountains offer the possibility of preparing ski slopes for all types of winter sports fans, from novices to top professional skiers.  The lower parts with characteristics of the valley climate are rich with a variety of flora, lakes, caves etc., and offer possibilities for development of summer tourism as well. Besides tourism, there are opportunities and natural resources for the development of agriculture and cattle-breading. Agricultural land takes 55% of the municipal territory —. Pastures cover 38.8%, and meadows 25% of the total agricultural land. Cultivable soil covers 18%, and a small area is orchard.  Forests take 42% of the territory of the municipality —. Beech is the most widely spread tree, but one can come across Turkey oak, white ash, birch and some other types of trees as well. Above  there are mixed and coniferous forests: pine, fir, spruce, juniper, as well as endemic trees like Pinus peuce, Pinus heldreichii, Pinus mugo, Taxus baccata and some others. The whole territory of the municipality is rich with rivers; about 250 springs manifest a presence of underground waters. The largest river is Lepenac which is made of two rivers – Tisova and Cerenacke river. There are also a number of mountain lakes; the three most popular are: Livadičko, Štrbačko and Big Jažinačko Lake.

Tourism
The municipality of Shtërpcë covers a surface of 247.36 square kilometers. It is located in the north-eastern side of Sharr Mountains, also known as the valley of Sirink which is the upper surface of the Lepenci river basin. The total population living in the territory of this municipality is about 13.812. Of these, 10.451 are Serbs and 3.341 are Albanian, while 20 are Roma The population density is 50 people for square kilometer. The municipality is surrounded by high mountains, where the highest peak reaches 2500 m (the peak of Luboten). These mountains are new, with tough ranges and ridges. It is recognized as an appropriate place for the development of tourism.

Brezovica ski center

The Brezovica ski center is a popular center which lies in the north-western side of the Sharr Mountains. Its distance from Prishtina Airport is 60 km. With its alpine nature and high mountainous environment, Brezovica and its surroundings remind you of most European and worldwide renowned touristic centers. Brezovica's surroundings cover different natural characteristics as the valley of Lepenci, its ridges reaching the height of 900m to 2.600 m. The lower zone of the tourism complex reaches a height of 900 to 980 m above the sea level and is wide slope covering the Lepenc. The Ormed village of this valley is called Brezovica whose primary function of tourism is in offering fine hotel accommodations such as: Narcio, Breza, Junior and other fine restaurants.  The middle zone is surrounded by the Muzhica mountains reaching a height of around 900–1300 m above sea level; it also presents a strong connection of skiing slopes. This zone is known as a weekend skiing line. The upper zone reaches the mountain height of 1700 m whose slopes descend from Muzhica's mountain bed. This port of ridge is known as Sfojk's house or "skiing center". This part of the  mountain is surrounded by many hotels such as: Molika, Kameni Dom, SC Šar. The Brezovica skiing center consists of 5 ski lifts, the majority of which are out of order, which unable you to reach the skiing slope of 3.000 m. In Brezovica you can perform many skiing activities because it fulfills the capacities of 5000 skiers. The snowfall structure offers a fast and safe skiing experience. Many national and inter skiing contests have been held in Brezovica which have contributed to its continual prosperity. Different sports teams perform their yearly training in Brezovica because it offers ideal working circumstances. During the summer season, Brezovica offers a great pleasure to its visitors, who can hike, hunt, fish and visit its historic monuments. This center is available during the whole year for seminars, symposiums and conference presentations.

Sharr Mountain National Park
Sharr Mountain National Park was established in 1986, covering a surface of 39.000 hectares. Restricted presentations of the Šar's nature are: mixed fresh woods lying on rocky fields of Rasemca garage. The birthplace of the bolcavic owl bind. As melting and flowing on wavy shapes, the gantwalls  of Monica valley, many iceberg lakes and many other shapes of glacial relief. The Šar mountain presents a real museum under the upper part of Kosovo. The Sharr mountain is also a field with flora and fauna diversity. The environment of Sharr has more than 112 species, starting from three species, bushes, herbs, animals etc. The Sharr mountain is also famous among many European beauties because it has over 147 butterfly species and 200 bird species . Among special poultices are: bradon eagle, golden eagle, grey eagle etc. On the upper zones of Sharr, you can see even wild cats, owls, wild bears, dear families, does and wild cats. The natural and cultural wolves (UNESCO) protection as a result of preserving its natural beauties.

Natural lakes

Traditionally they belong to the Shtërpcë municipality formed as a result of Iceberg erosions. The people of Shtërpcë know them as "mountains eyes" thanks to their beauty. Depending on the weather conditions, these lakes are covered with snow from November to May. It consists of lakes: Livadh lake, Mountain Vir lake, small Jazhincë lake etc.
The inhabitants of Shtërpcë still call it Štrebačko lake. It covers wide plains and deep circle land the peak of Livadicë 2491 m reaching the height of 2.173 and its width of 220–124 m. The sea shore length is 685 m. The lake's depth is various, starting from 6.50-8.60 m depending on weather conditions. The visibility of the lakes' water is clear and its bottom can be seen. The surface is filled with water from main falls, snowfalls and snow melting and a great number of underwater springs. In this lake the brown trout also lives, but as a result of tough weather and water conditions it cannot be inseminated.

Churches

There are two Orthodox churches in Shtërpcë: St. Nikola (Sveti Nikola) and St. Jovan (Sveti Jovan). St. Nikola was built in 1576-77 by locals, and St. Jovan was built in 1911.  One of the priests discovered a part of wall with frescoes in St. Nikola church from a much older time. Every Sunday morning and for holidays there are liturgies in St. Nikola church, and in  St. Jovan church there are liturgies just on St. Jovan’s day, but  the churches are open every day.

House of Culture
The House of Culture is in Shtërpcë in the center of town, next to the municipal house. The name of the House of Culture is St. Sava (Sveti Sava). Inside there is a public library and also a hall which hosts cultural events such as folk dance ensembles and art exhibitions.

Traditions
One traditional holiday that is celebrated in Shtërpcë is Bele Poklade, also called Procka.

Historical monuments

Public services and infrastructure

Administration
The town of Shtërpcë is the seat of the municipality government. It also has a hospital and ambulances. Every morning buses travel from Brezovica to Belgrade, with stop in Shtërpcë.

Education

There are primary and high schools in Shtërpcë. The high school is named for Jovan Cvijic. The high school has many courses of study including medicine, economy, law, gymnasium (general studies), and tourism.  Students go in two shifts (1st and 2nd year go in the afternoon, and 3rd and 4th year go in the morning). There are about 400 students in the school. The primary school is named for Staja Marković. There are about 500 students in the primary school, in 1st through 8th grades. Those who live in the other villages of Sirinic valley can come to school with school buses. 

There is also a kindergarten in Shtërpcë that is named Fawn of the Shara.

See also
Municipalities of Kosovo
Cities and towns in Kosovo
Populated places in Kosovo

Notes and references
Notes

References

External links 

 OSCE Profile of Štrpce/Shtërpcë
 Official website at the Republic of Kosovo
 Web site of ski resort Brezovica and Štrpce
 About coat of arms and banner of Štrpce

 
Cities in Kosovo
Municipalities of Kosovo
Serbian enclaves in Kosovo